Edwin A. Roberts Jr. (born November 13, 1932) is an American journalist. He won the 1974 Pulitzer Prize for Commentary.

Life
He was born in Weehawken, New Jersey. He graduated from The College of William and Mary, and New York University.

References

American male journalists
Pulitzer Prize for Commentary winners
New York University alumni
Living people
1932 births
College of William & Mary alumni